Lesbian, gay, bisexual, and transgender (LGBT) persons in the U.S. state of North Dakota may face some legal challenges not experienced by non-LGBT residents. Same-sex sexual activity is legal in North Dakota, and same-sex couples and families headed by same-sex couples are eligible for all of the protections available to opposite-sex married couples; same-sex marriage has been legal since June 2015 as a result of Obergefell v. Hodges. State statutes do not address discrimination on account of sexual orientation or gender identity; however, the U.S. Supreme Court's ruling in Bostock v. Clayton County established that employment discrimination against LGBT people is illegal under federal law.

Laws regarding same-sex sexual activity
Prior to European settlement in the 18th and 19th centuries, there were no known legal or social punishments for engaging in homosexual activity. Perceptions toward gender and sexuality among the Native Americans were different to that of the Western world. Several had traditions of "third gender" people (nowadays also called "two-spirit") who would dress and act as the opposite gender, perform tasks associated with the opposite gender and be fully recognized as such by the members of the tribe. Among the Arikara, male-bodied people who act as women are known as skuxát. Likewise, the Hidatsa and the Mandan refer to them as miati and mihdeke, respectively, while they are known as wįktą, winkta and wíŋkte (or winkte) among the Assiniboine, the Dakota and the Lakota.

The first criminal law against sodomy in North Dakota was enacted in 1862, then the Dakota Territory. It prohibited heterosexual and homosexual fellatio. The law was expanded in 1885 to include anal intercourse. The state's vagrancy laws were expanded in 1903 to cover anyone whose speech or conduct was deemed to be "lewd, wanton and lascivious". In State v. Nelson (1917), the North Dakota Supreme Court broadened the scope of the sodomy law to include acts of cunnilingus.

In 1927, a law initially designed to permit the sterilization of mentally and physically disabled inmates was expanded to include anyone who state authorities believed might be "habitual criminals, moral degenerates and sexual perverts". The forced sterilization law was repealed in 1965.

In 1973, the state legalized private, adult, consensual homosexual relations as part of a larger revision of the Criminal Code that set the universal age of consent at eighteen years.

Recognition of same-sex relationships

Same-sex marriage has been legal in North Dakota since the U.S. Supreme Court decision in Obergefell v. Hodges on June 26, 2015, which found the denial of marriage rights to same-sex couples unconstitutional. The state had previously restricted marriage to the union of one man and one woman and denied recognition to same-sex unions under any legal designation both in its Constitution and by statute.

A lawsuit challenging the state's refusal to license and recognize same-sex marriages, Ramsay v. Dalrymple, was initiated in June 2014, but proceedings were suspended in January 2015 pending action by the U.S. Supreme Court in related cases.

In August 2020, the Turtle Mountain Band of Chippewa Indians legalized same-sex marriage within its reservation by a vote of 6–2; the first Native American tribal jurisdiction in North Dakota to do so.

Adoption and parenting
North Dakota permits adoption by individuals and state law does not expressly ban LGBT people or same-sex couples from adopting or having custody of children. However, in the 1980s, the North Dakota Supreme Court ruled that because of societal prejudices, the sexual orientation of a parent would be the deciding factor in child custody cases. This ruling was subsequently reversed in 2003.

North Dakota law expressly allows private adoption organizations in the state to discriminate against LGBT individuals or couples seeking to adopt children, if such discrimination is based on a sincerely held religious belief.

Lesbian couples have access to assisted reproduction services, such as in vitro fertilization. State law recognizes the non-genetic, non-gestational mother as a legal parent to a child born via donor insemination, irrespective of the marital status of the parents. In addition, North Dakota law explicitly permits gestational surrogacy. This statute also declares that a child born to a gestational surrogate is the child of the intended parents, whether same-sex or different-sex, for all intents and purposes. Traditional surrogacy is prohibited regardless of sexual orientation.

Discrimination protections

North Dakota statutes do not explicitly address discrimination on the basis of sexual orientation or gender identity.

Since 2001, the city of Fargo has had a non-discrimination policy that includes sexual orientation, but it only applies to city employees. A similar policy exists in Jamestown. The Human Rights Campaign added Bismarck and Mandan to this list in 2016 under its annual "Municipal Equality Index", though removed them in later versions of the index.

On June 17, 2013, the Grand Forks City Council approved a measure to protect city employees and city job applicants from discrimination based on gender identity and sexual orientation, becoming the second city in North Dakota to do so, and the first to address gender identity-based discrimination. Later that year, the city became the first in North Dakota to ban discrimination in rental housing based on sexual orientation or gender identity.

On February 17, 2015, the North Dakota Senate voted 25–22 to approve a bill that would have banned discrimination on the basis of sexual orientation or gender identity in employment, housing and public accommodations. The bill did not receive enough votes to pass in the House of Representatives.

In April 2021, Governor Doug Burgum signed a bill into law allowing student groups at colleges, universities and high schools to discriminate against LGBT students. Many public colleges and universities have policies requiring students organizations receiving financial support from the institution not to discriminate against students based on race, sex, religion, sexual orientation or gender identity. These policies were upheld as constitutional by the Supreme Court of the United States in 2010 in Christian Legal Society v. Martinez.

Bostock v. Clayton County

On June 15, 2020, the U.S. Supreme Court ruled in Bostock v. Clayton County, consolidated with Altitude Express, Inc. v. Zarda, and in R.G. & G.R. Harris Funeral Homes Inc. v. Equal Employment Opportunity Commission that discrimination in the workplace on the basis of sexual orientation or gender identity is discrimination on the basis of sex, and Title VII therefore protects LGBT employees from discrimination.

Hate crime law
North Dakota law does not address hate crimes based on gender identity or sexual orientation.

North Dakota does have a law that addresses hate or bias based crimes, but it does not address sexual orientation or gender identity. The Federal Hate Crimes Statistics Act of 1990 encouraged states to report hate crime data to the FBI. Fargo is the city responsible for reporting hate crimes to the state and federal governments. Studies have shown that 2 in 3 hate crimes go unreported. This small knowledge of hate crimes may contribute to the lack of legislation in support of the LGBT community. Groups like the Human Rights Campaign, along with other organizations, are currently working with North Dakota law officials in order to modify the hate crime laws to be LGBT-inclusive.

Although North Dakota's hate crime law does not protect LGBT people, U.S. federal law has addressed the categories of sexual orientation and gender identity since 2009, when the Matthew Shepard and James Byrd Jr. Hate Crimes Prevention Act was signed into law by President Barack Obama. Hate crimes committed on the basis of the victim's sexual orientation or gender identity can be prosecuted in federal court.

Transgender rights

North Dakota permits transgender people to change their legal gender. The North Dakota Health Department will issue an amended birth certificate on receipt of a written request of "the person who has undergone the operation (sex reassignment surgery)", an affidavit by a physician stating "that the physician has performed an operation on the person, and that by reason of the operation, the sex designation of such person's birth record should be changed", a court order for legal name change, and payment of the associated fees. The Department of Transportation will update the gender marker on a driver's license and state ID card upon receipt of a letter signed by a physician or therapist stating that the applicant has completed a permanent gender change.

In 2021, the North Dakota Legislature passed legislation to ban transgender students from participating in school sport teams. The bill passed the House by a vote of 69–25 and the Senate by a vote 27–20. The Governor of North Dakota, Doug Burgum, vetoed the bill on April 21, 2021. Overriding the governor's veto would require a two-thirds majority in both chambers.

Politics
In July 2020, the North Dakotan Republican delegates voted in favor of the party's 2020 election platform. The platform opposes absolutely any civil rights protections for LGBT people, while accusing transgender people "of preying on women" and LGBT people of "recruiting children". Many Republican delegates condemned the platform. Republican Governor Doug Burgum also opposed the anti-gay platform, calling it "divisive and divisional", and saying, "As I've long said, all North Dakotans deserve to be treated equally and live free of discrimination".

Carrie Evans was elected to the Minot City Council in June 2020 and is the first openly lesbian to hold elected office in the state. In 2012, Joshua Boschee became the first openly gay man to be elected to the North Dakota House of Representatives. In 2015, Representative Randy Boehning was outed as bisexual, after having voted against an LGBT rights bill in the House.

Conversion therapy laws
In June 2021, a policy was adopted in committee within North Dakota from a regulation (which does not require legislative approval) - to legally ban conversion therapy by social workers, phycologists and councilers with their clients and/or hosts.

Public opinion
A 2017 Public Religion Research Institute (PRRI) opinion poll found that 53% of North Dakota residents supported same-sex marriage, while 35% opposed it and 12% were unsure.

The same PRRI poll also found that 58% of North Dakotans supported an anti-discrimination law covering sexual orientation and gender identity, while 29% were opposed. Furthermore, 49% were against allowing businesses to refuse to serve gay and lesbian people due to religious beliefs, while 38% supported allowing such religiously-based refusals.

Summary table

See also
LGBT history in North Dakota

References

LGBT rights in North Dakota